Sanjoy Sen (born 12 December 1960) is a football manager who currently serves as the assistant manager of Indian Super League side ATK Mohun Bagan. Under his leadership Mohun Bagan won the title of Hero I-League 2014–15 and Hero Federation Cup 2015–16.

Coaching career

Prayag United
In the summer of 2010 Sen signed with I-League club Prayag United S.C. who were then known as Chirag United Sports Club as they were then sponsored and owned by Chirag Computers. After his first season in charge he led Prayag to an eighth-place finish out of fourteen teams in the I-League.

Mohammedan Sporting Club
Mohammedan Sporting had appointed Sen as their new head coach for the remainder of the 2012/13 season. Sen's aim for the rest of the season was to gain promotion with Mohammedan Sporting to the I-League from the 2nd Division. He succeeded as the century-old side won the I-League 2nd Division, and earned promotion to the I-League 2013-14 along with Rangdajied. On 15 May 2013, he resigned as Mohammedan coach, he had revealed to The Telegraph that with his son Class X Board examinations approaching, it would be difficult for him to continue as the Mohammedan Sporting coach.

On 16 August 2013, Sen was appointed as Mohammedan's head coach for the rest of the season. After that he won 2013 Durand Cup and he also won 2014 IFA Shield

Mohun Bagan Athletic Club
On 8 December 2014, Sen was appointed as the coach for Mohun Bagan A.C.
He won 2014–15 I-League with Mohun Bagan A.C. The Club won the trophy after 13 Year since they last won under the coach Subrata Bhattacharya in 2001-02.
He also won 2015–16 Indian Federation Cup with Mohun Bagan A.C. He resigned on 2 January 2018.

Honours

Manager

Mohammedan
I-League 2nd Division:2013 (Runners up)
Durand Cup:2013
IFA Shield:2014

Mohun Bagan
I-League: 2014–15
I-League (Runners up): 2015–16, 2016–17 
Federation Cup Runners up: 2015–16

Individual
Best Coach of 2014-15 I-League
Best Coach of 2013 I-League 2nd Division

References

External links

1960 births
Living people
Indian football managers
I-League managers
United SC managers
Mohun Bagan AC managers
Pailan Arrows managers
Indian Arrows FC managers
Mohammedan SC (Kolkata) managers